South Yorkshire Transport (SYT) was a bus operator that provided services around South Yorkshire and outlying areas. The company was formed as an 'arms-length' successor of the South Yorkshire Passenger Transport Executive (SYPTE) in 1986, which was broken up as a result of the deregulation of bus services. South Yorkshire Transport operated buses in and around Doncaster, Rotherham and Sheffield with some services extending to Chesterfield, Leeds and Barnsley.

In November 1993 South Yorkshire Transport, now rebranded Mainline, was sold in a management buyout. A 20% stake in the company was divested to FirstBus from the Stagecoach Group in 1995, and eventually in 1998, First purchased Mainline, later rebranding the operation to First South Yorkshire.

History
The South Yorkshire Passenger Transport Executive (SYPTE) was formed in 1974 under the provisions of the Local Government Act 1972, and until 1986, ran a majority of bus services in South Yorkshire. In 1986, however, bus services were deregulated following the passage of the Transport Act 1985, with local authorities in the United Kingdom required to sell the operations of their passenger transport executives (PTEs) to private companies. South Yorkshire PTE was rebranded to 'South Yorkshire Transport' (stylised as South Yorkshire's Transport) shortly before deregulation, with a large red band and smaller red and brown stripes being applied onto buses in the existing brown and cream livery, as well as new 'SYT' logos replacing the PTE's 'flying duck' logo on all company property.

In the months prior to deregulation, fare increases of up to 300% were enacted and staff redundancies across the company were carried out in order to cover running costs commercially. This included the withdrawal or conversion of conductor operated buses to one-person operation by 1986, which saw conductors either trained to become drivers or be made redundant from the company.

On 26 October 1986, deregulation went into effect, and South Yorkshire Transport, now established as an 'arms-length' operator by the local authority, began operations. However, the company was not sold into privatisation immediately following deregulation, causing South Yorkshire to become the first former PTE to be issued an ultimatum to privatise or be broken up by the Department of Transport in 1989. South Yorkshire Transport was eventually sold in a management buyout in November 1993, following the relaxing of another ultimatum which stipulated that operators must be sold by the end of the year to retain the complete proceeds of their sale.

Throughout the late-1980s and early-1990s, South Yorkshire Transport faced serious competition from a number of independent operators and group subsidiaries in and around Sheffield. The most notorious of these included Sheffield Omnibus, Andrews and Yorkshire Terrier, which was founded by former SYT employees. Like many post-deregulation operators at the time, South Yorkshire Transport promptly began to operate midibuses in competition with these other independents in 1988, known as the 'Eager Beaver' and 'Little Nipper' services, initially operated using a mixed fleet of new and former Lincoln City Transport Reeve Burgess Beaver-bodied Renault 50 series minibuses. 240 of these Reeve Burgess/Dodge midibuses would eventually be acquired for these competing routes between 1987 and 1991 by South Yorkshire Transport. At its peak in 1992, 13 operators were running competing services in and around Sheffield, with up to 350 buses an hour entering the city centre.

South Yorkshire Transport would eventually go on to acquire the business of some of their competitors, including Sheffield United Tours (SUT) and Sheafline, who subsequently became a merged subsidiary of the company following an aborted attempt three years prior before eventually having their operations absorbed into SYT. South Yorkshire's acquisitions, creating an operating area of 1.65% of the United Kingdom, had previously attracted the attention of the Office of Fair Trading and the Monopolies and Mergers Commission, with the company being referred to the House of Lords and the mergers of both SUT and Sheaf Line being ruled as against the public interest at the time.

However, competition between Andrews, Sheffield Omnibus and Yorkshire Terrier would still remain. Yorkshire Terrier and Andrews would eventually be purchased by Yorkshire Traction, who themselves were eventually purchased by the Stagecoach Group to become Stagecoach Yorkshire. Sheffield Omnibus, meanwhile, would compete independently until 1995, managing to purchase fleets of Alexander PS types on Volvo chassis and Alexander-bodied Leyland Olympians on lease before it was merged into the Traction Group with Andrews.

South Yorkshire Transport began the process of branding its operations to 'Mainline' in June 1989, adopting a predominantly yellow livery with regional identifiers for its Sheffield, Doncaster and Rotherham divisions initially as route branding. These regional identifiers were then dropped in 1992 and the Mainline name was adopted across the company in a £750,000 pre-privatisation publicity drive, with a new red and yellow livery combining the blue and silver elements of the Doncaster and Rotherham liveries being introduced to the bus fleet. On 7 June 1993, prior to South Yorkshire Transport's sale into privatisation, the company was renamed 'Mainline Group Ltd'.
 
The company acquired its first low-floor buses in January 1996. These were eleven Wright Crusaders on the Volvo B6LE chassis. All but two of these would be branded with 'easiaccess' branding, with the latter two being branded for Goole town services contracted to Mainline by Humberside County Council. Prior to this, the company had been a notable buyer of the Alexander PS type on the Volvo B10M chassis, ordering a total of 180 from 1990 to 1996.

Mainline was eventually sold to the FirstGroup. The Stagecoach Group had purchased a 20% stake in the company in 1995, however the Office of Fair Trading ordered this stake to be divested from the group in January 1996. The 20% stake would be acquired by FirstBus, who would later purchase the entirety of the company for £29.7million in 1998. By 2000, a new group livery was introduced and the company was renamed First South Yorkshire, phasing out both the Mainline name and livery.

Operations

Doncaster
Buses in Doncaster were based at two garages in the borough. The main depot was the former Doncaster Corporation garage on Leicester Avenue, close to Doncaster Racecourse, where a experimental trolleybus had been previously trialled before deregulation. A second, smaller garage was located on Bootham Lane in Dunscroft.

In the 1980s, a new workshop building was erected at the rear of the yard behind the Leicester Avenue garage. In the early 1990s, the main depot building was demolished and the land was sold. This made way for a new Wickes DIY store. The new workshop, yard and a small section of the old garage building, which contained a bus-wash facility, remained.

Rotherham
Buses in Rotherham were based at a large garage on Midland Road, which was also home to the central engineering works of South Yorkshire Transport. In 1992, the Midland Road works were contracted to refurbish 220 of London Buses' AEC Routemasters with new drivelines and interiors. Following the sale of the company to the FirstGroup, the Midland Road works were retained as the 'Commercial Unit' for the repainting and refurbishment of the group's buses. The Midland Road garage and thus, the 'Commercial Unit', was eventually closed in 2017.

Sheffield
Buses in Sheffield were initially operated from five garages; East Bank, Greenland Road, Halfway, Herries Road and Leadmill. The latter two were closed by Mainline in 1994, while East Bank was reopened in the same year and renamed Olive Grove.

Ipswich
A newly privatised Mainline had planned to operate services in Ipswich in competition with local operator Ipswich Buses in 1994. Ten Volvo B6s with Plaxton Pointer bodywork were purchased and planned to operate on routes ran by Ipswich Buses to compete for passengers, intended to be based at a Volvo commercial dealership. However, Mainline soon decided not to commence services and pulled out of Ipswich, selling their operations and the ten Volvo B6s to Eastern Counties.

Fleet

An initial fleet of over 1,000 buses, including 321 Dennis Dominators, 274 Leyland Atlanteans and 176 Daimler Fleetlines, 170 MCW Metrobuses, as well as some Volvo Ailsas, Leyland Nationals and Leyland-DAB articulated buses were inherited from SYPTE. By the time of First's purchase of the company in 1998, this had been reduced to over 700 buses.

Prior to the acquisition of Mainline by the FirstGroup, the company had amassed a total of 180 Volvo B10M single deckers with Alexander PS type bodywork from 1990 to 1996. These were initially acquired to lower running costs and reduce vandalism, and by 1996, Mainline were the second-largest operators of the type behind the Stagecoach Group. Following a comparative period against a Dennis Dart with Northern Counties Paladin bodywork two years prior, Mainline also purchased 35 Volvo B6s with Plaxton Pointer bodywork, as well as 10 for the cancelled Ipswich operation.

See also
South Yorkshire Passenger Transport Executive
First South Yorkshire
South Yorkshire Transport Museum

References

Bus transport in Doncaster
1986 establishments in England
1998 disestablishments in England
Former bus operators in South Yorkshire
British companies disestablished in 1993
British companies established in 1986